Cheryl Schonhardt-Bailey, FBA (born June 5, 1961) is a British-American professor of political science at the London School of Economics and Political Science. She served as the LSE's Head of the Department of Government from 2019 to 2022.

She has published many books and articles on British trade policy in the nineteenth century, such as From the Corn Laws to Free Trade: Interests, Ideas, and Institutions in Historical Perspective. Her articles have appeared in the American Political Science Review, World Politics, the British Journal of Political Science, Political Analysis, PS: Political Science and Politics, and Parliamentary History.

Her current research interests include the quantification and spatial analysis of textual data in the form of political deliberation, particularly in monetary policy making settings (e.g., the United States Congress, the Federal Open Market Committee). She also writes about the speeches of prominent politicians including George W. Bush, Margaret Thatcher and Ronald Reagan.

She was elected a fellow of the British Academy in 2015.

Personal life 
Schonhardt-Bailey is from Idaho in the western United States and obtained a bachelor of arts degree in political science from Boise State University. She earned both a master of arts and doctorate of philosophy degrees in political science from the University of California, Los Angeles.

She is married to Andrew Bailey, current Governor of the Bank of England. They have two children and live in London, England.

Publications
 Deliberating American Monetary Policy: A Textual Analysis Cheryl Schonhardt-Bailey, MIT Press 2013.
 Battles Over Free Trade: Anglo-American Experiences with International Trade, 1776-2006 (Co-editor), Pickering & Chatto Publishers Ltd, 2008..
 Free Trade: The Repeal of the Corn Laws Cheryl Schonhardt-Bailey, MIT Press 2006.
 From the Corn Laws to Free Trade: Interests, Ideas, and Institutions in Historical Perspective Cheryl Schonhardt-Bailey, MIT Press 2006.
 International Trade and Political Institutions: Instituting Trade in the Long 19th Century Fiona McGillivray, Iain McLean, Robert Pahre and Cheryl Schonhardt-Bailey, Cheltenham, UK and Northampton, MA: 2002..
 The Rise of Free Trade, in 4 volumes Cheryl Schonhardt-Bailey, Routledge, 1997..

References

External links
 Cheryl Schonhardt-Bailey’s Website
 LSE Experts page
 Profile on LSE Government Department website

Academics of the London School of Economics
Living people
Fellows of the British Academy
1961 births
Women political scientists
Boise State University alumni
University of California, Los Angeles alumni